Air Ontario Inc. was a regional Canadian airline headquartered in Sarnia then London, Ontario. In 2002, Air Ontario became Air Canada Jazz.

History 

Great Lakes Airlines was formed in 1958, becoming Air Ontario Ltd. in 1983 and Air Ontario Inc. in June 1987. By 1975, GLA was in trouble and was purchased by a partnership which included James Plaxton, who brought in to the capital the DeLuce family when he merged it with their Austin Airways operation. In 1986, Air Canada and Pacific Western Airlines split 49% of the shares. In 1987, Air Canada and Austin split the shares in a 3:1 ratio upon its Canadian incorporation.

As a wholly owned subsidiary of Air Canada, Air Ontario's operation as an Air Canada Connector code sharing partner increased substantially in the intra-Ontario marketplace with Air Canada's decision in February 1990, to discontinue Mainline service to North Bay, Sudbury, Timmins and Windsor. Route expansion from Toronto Island Airport nonstop to both Montreal and Ottawa soon followed, along with the addition of new routes into the United States.

In December 2000, Air Ontario was amalgamated into Air Canada.

In January 2001, a newly merged carrier called Air Canada Regional Inc. was established. A wholly owned subsidiary of Air Canada, this company combined the individual strengths of four regional airlines—Air BC, Air Nova, Air Ontario, and Canadian Regional Airlines. Consolidation of these four companies was completed in 2002 and was marked by the launch of a new name and brand—Air Canada Jazz.

Fleet

As of 2001, the Air Ontario fleet comprised the following turboprop aircraft:

 41 – de Havilland Canada DHC-8-100 
 7 – de Havilland Canada DHC-8-300

Total aircraft in fleet in 2001: 48

The airline also previously operated Convair 580 turboprop and Fokker F28 Fellowship jet aircraft.  The Convair 580 was initially operated in Air Canada Connector service along with the Dash 8  while the F28 was the only jet aircraft type ever flown by Air Ontario.

Destinations in 1984
Air Ontario was operating Convair 580 turboprops (later replaced by Fokker F28 Fellowship in 1989) as an independent air carrier with scheduled passenger service to the following destinations in the Canadian provinces of Ontario and Quebec as well as to two destinations in the United States in 1984:

 Ontario
London — London International Airport
Ottawa — Ottawa Macdonald–Cartier International Airport
Sarnia — Sarnia Chris Hadfield Airport
Sudbury — Sudbury Airport
Toronto — Toronto Pearson International Airport
 Quebec
Montréal — Montréal Dorval International Airport
 United States
Cleveland, OH — Cleveland Hopkins International Airport
Hartford, CT — Bradley International Airport

Destinations in 1992
Air Ontario was operating Air Canada Connector service via a code sharing agreement with Air Canada to the following destinations in Canada and the United States in 1992; by 1995, Air Ontario had added nonstop Air Canada Connector service between Toronto and Baltimore and was operating all flights system-wide with de Havilland Canada DHC-8 Dash 8 turboprop aircraft.

 Manitoba
Winnipeg — Winnipeg James Armstrong Richardson International Airport
 Ontario
London — London International Airport
North Bay — North Bay/Jack Garland Airport
Ottawa — Ottawa Macdonald–Cartier International Airport
Sarnia — Sarnia Chris Hadfield Airport
Sault Ste. Marie — Sault Ste. Marie Airport
Sudbury — Sudbury Airport
Thunder Bay — Thunder Bay International Airport
Timmins — Timmins/Victor M. Power Airport
Toronto
Billy Bishop Toronto City Airport
Toronto Pearson International Airport
Windsor — Windsor International Airport
 Quebec
Montréal — Montréal Dorval International Airport
 United States
Baltimore, MD — Baltimore/Washington International Thurgood Marshall Airport
Cleveland, OH — Cleveland Hopkins International Airport
Hartford, CT — Bradley International Airport
Newark, NJ — Newark Liberty International Airport

Accidents and incidents 
On 1 November 1988, Douglas C-47A C-FBJE crashed into Pikangikum Lake on a domestic cargo flight from Red Lake Airport to Pikangikum Airport. Two of the three people on board were killed.
On March 10, 1989, Air Ontario Flight 1363, a Fokker F28-1000 Fellowship twin jet, registration C-FONF, crashed near Dryden, Ontario immediately after take-off en route from Dryden to Winnipeg with this flight having previously departed from Thunder Bay. The aircraft crashed after only forty-nine seconds after liftoff from the Dryden Regional Airport because it was not able to achieve enough altitude to clear the trees beyond the end of the runway due to ice and snow on the wings. This caused the death of 21 of 65 passengers and 3 of 4 crew members. Some of the survivors were able to escape from the plane on their own but the others were carried to safety. The accident happened because the APU (auxiliary power unit) did not work, so the crew had to keep one of the engines running at Dryden. However, the necessary de-icing was only authorised if both the main engines are stopped. Air Ontario's policies forbid de-icing if one of the engines was running due to the possibility of the fumes being sucked into the air conditioning system and harming those in the cabin. Furthermore, if the pilots had shut down the engines, with no APU and with Dryden airport not having the equipment required to restart the engines, the plane would have been stranded. This situation was exacerbated by an extended wait on the taxiway while priority was given to an incoming Cessna. However, it is possible that de-icing would not have prevented this accident, as the type of fluid commonly used at the time was not intended for long wait times. Additionally, the de-icing process would be completed at the terminal, and not on the runway, reducing the time that the fluid would be effective after application. Recommendations made in the accident report included use of better de-icing fluid, more frequent maintenance of Air Ontario's planes, and de-icing directly on the runway, as well as prioritizing planes that had been de-iced due to the narrow window remaining for take-off.

See also 
 List of defunct airlines of Canada

References

External links

Air Ontario (Archive)
Air Ontario history page at Air Canada Jazz

 
Air Canada
Defunct airlines of Canada
Airlines established in 1987
Airlines disestablished in 2001
Companies based in London, Ontario
1987 establishments in Ontario
2001 disestablishments in Ontario
Former Star Alliance affiliate members